Sir John Minsterworth (died 1377) was a fourteenth-century English knight from Gloucestershire, who fought in the Hundred Years' War and was executed by King Edward III for treason. Nothing is known of his upbringing (even, for example, when he was knighted or by whom) but he first comes to prominence during the 1370 invasion of France. The war, under the command of the King's son, Edward the Black Prince, was going poorly and had only recently restarted after a nine-year truce. Minsterworth was part of a force sent to relieve the English command in France under the nominal leadership of Sir Robert Knolles, whom contemporaries praised for his military acumen. Landing in the north, Knolles and Minsterworth carved their way to the west of France. There, divisions among the leaders—which may have been present before the campaign began—erupted into mutiny.

Minsterworth may have despised Knolles for his reputation and status, and with others split from Knolles's main force. Much of that force was destroyed in December 1370 by the French army at the Battle of Pontvallain. Minsterworth and a breakaway force made their way to Brittany despite frequent ambushes and French raids, and eventually—albeit seeing most of the remnant of his army massacred on the Breton shore—to England. There he attempted to blame Knolles for the disaster, and although Minsterworth's former commander was found culpable of many of the military mishaps that had occurred, Minsterworth did not escape blame either.

Minsterworth left England in 1372 to join the French army. Five years later he met and conspired with the rebel Welsh lord, Owen of Wales, and, for reasons which are now obscure, supported Owen's proposed French-backed invasion of England. In 1377, while still abroad, he was captured by the English and sent home to be tried for treason. Convicted on conspiracy charges, he was executed and his corpse was drawn and quartered before being distributed across the kingdom.

Service in France and mutiny 
Nothing is known of John Minsterworth's early life, although he was probably born in Minsterworth, Gloucestershire, from which he presumably took his surname. The historian Andrew Ayton describes him as a "shadowy... man of obscure origins". His first recorded appearance is in 1367 when took a contract with Humphrey, Earl of Hereford to serve in France; he was also responsible for recruiting Hereford's large retinue. The following year he indentured to join the 1370 English expedition to France during the Hundred Years' War. His activities on that campaign then have incurred criticism from various historians; James Sherborne, for example, has said Minsterworth caused "much trouble" on the campaign, while the historian Jonathan Sumption describes him as an "ambitious hothead".

The expeditionary force assembled at Rye and Winchelsea in July 1370. It was the first English army to France led by a commander below the rank of earl or other peers. The command was originally given to Sir Robert Knolles of Cheshire, but delays and criticism of Knolles resulted in joint command given to Knolles and three other experienced captains, Sir Alan Buxhull, Sir Thomas Grandison and Sir John Bourchier. Minsterworth acted under Knolles's captaincy.  Sherborne suggests that there may possibly have been "some doubt about Knolles... even before the army sailed". This system of shared leadership appears to have led to jealousies and rivalries arising, particularly regarding how ransom and booty would be distributed. The medievalist Mark Ormrod suggests that Knolles's appointment may have implied superiority over his fellow captains, exacerbating tensions among them, of whom Minsterworth was the most outspoken. Contemporary chronicler claim that Knolles's lacked breeding. Jean Le Bel states that he was originally a clothworker, while Thomas Walsingham says he was a "poor and lowly valet". Either way, Minsterworth seems to have seen himself as socially outranking Knolles. As a result, Sumption suggests that Minsterworth "conceived a virulent hatred of his commander", with Minsterworth calling Knolles such names as "the Old Freebooter", an "old brigand", a "tomb-robber" while constantly criticising his leadership.

Although Minsterworth has been seen as a "comparatively obscure" figure in political society, and of "very modest means", he nevertheless commanded the largest retinue of the army, second only to Knolles himself. His contingent comprised ten knights, around 200 men-at-arms and 300 archers. The scholar Anne Curry argues that by then, gentry such as Minsterworth were being relied on to field armies comparable in size to those led by the nobility in the earlier years of the war. For this he received £2000 in advance wages. Geographically, his force was recruited from across the country. This included areas close to Minsterworth, such as South Wales and Gloucester, but also further afield, such as Bedfordshire, London, Kingston upon Thames, Daventry, Lincolnshire and Warwickshire. In this, he was not unlike the great ducal captains, who also recruited far beyond their feudal heartlands, and entered sub-indentures. Much of this force was composed of "footloose professionals", as they have been called, often little more than a collection of "outcasts, apostate clergymen and criminals on the run... who served for loot and pardons". Minsterworth had to rely on such men because he lacked the recruiting networks in England that a great lord would have possessed through land holding, tenantry and wide-ranging social influence. While he did recruit men of status who could themselves recruit, such as Sir Thomas Fauconberg from the Marches, in many cases his recruitment may reflect connections made as a freebooter. This was in contrast, for example, to Knolles, whose wealth allowed him to bear the cost of maintaining an army in the field for an extended period.

Landing at Calais, the army began a chevauchée (horse charge) across northern and southwestern France to Bordeaux. This was intended to draw the French away from Aquitaine, where the Black Prince was about to begin another campaign with John, Earl of Pembroke. By November 1370, Minsterworth had rebelled under Knolles's leadership, and became the leader of the increasingly numerous malcontents. Although by this time Knolles was a soldier of "great fame", says the medievalist Rosemary Horrox, Minsterworth neither appreciated nor respected the man or his abilities. The scholar Michael Prestwich has suggested that his eventual desertion from Knolles's army was encouraged by the dire straits Knolles's army now found itself in. The chevauchée had achieved superficial successes, but, due to its failure to force the French to battle, it was under constant attrition; by now, the army was on the verge of disintegration, mainly due to Minsterworth's mutiny. Knolles may have aggravated his fellow captains further by keeping for himself a disproportionally large amount of the ransoms and booty. This was important to Minsterworth, not only because it impacted his own potential profit, but made it harder to pay his own men, who might, in turn, have deserted him. The tactical and military failures of the campaign were placed firmly at Knolles's door, and he was increasingly accused of misjudgement and inexperience; he may have been as unwilling to face the French in open battle as they were him, which could also have increased dissent among men who felt themselves to be "better formed in chivalry"; Minsterworth told his companions, "it redounded to their great dishonour to be subjected" to Knolles.

Division of the English force 

A contemporary chronicler relates how "out of envy and self-importance" the English captains ended up dividing their army into four, and went separate ways, probably to make foraging easier and increase profits. Minsterworth's force was the first to leave; Knolles followed, taking the majority of the army with him. Soon after, in early December 1370, what remained of the English army was routed at the Battle of Pontvallain. Minsterworth was at the battle, and clearly far enough away to escape the enemy. It is possible that he was in communication with the French and that his information lead to the English collapse.

Whatever role Minsterworth played, on hearing of the result he fled to Brittany, probably to Knolles's castle at Derval. There, with Knolles, he spent the winter comfortably. Minsterworth decided to return his army to England early the following year. Leaving Knolles in Derval, Minsterworth led a force of somewhere between a few hundred and 1,100 men—possibly including recently arrived, albeit now useless, reinforcements from England—to the port of Pointe Saint-Mathieu, Finistère. Continual ambushes depleted their numbers . Worse news awaited them. When they arrived at the port, there were only two small ships available, far too few for the couple of hundred men who needed transport. Minsterworth was one of the few who could afford passage; those who remained were massacred when the French caught up with them.

Return to England 
Minsterworth's return to England "as one of the only prominent survivors either not dead, still serving in France, or languishing in a French prison", began a lengthy period of acrimony and recrimination. While he bore most responsibility for the disaster—being, according to Baker, "as guilty as any man for the break up of the army"—at first Minsterworth managed to avoid almost all the blame by putting the responsibility on Knolles. In July 1372, the King's Council effectively agreed with him and condemned Knolles and Buxhill for the defeat.

After the Black Prince and John of Gaunt spoke out for Knolles, the King declared that "he should not be held as responsible as his men for their unruliness, disobedience and arrogance". Edward ensured that Minsterworth was no longer exculpated: he was immediately arrested and charged with traducing Knolles. Minsterworth failed to appear before the council's enquiry, and at this point—"humiliated...and frustrated in his ambitions"—renounced his allegiance to Edward III. His failure to appear before the council resulted in automatic outlawry, meaning his estates could be seized by the crown.

Later years, treason and death

Renegade in France 
Minsterworth again left for France in 1372. He was serving in the French army the following year, but it is unknown if this was after surrender or capture, or whether he was already in contact with King Charles V of France by now. The Anonimalle Chronicler condemned this as a betrayal of trust, castigating Minsterworth as having "sold himself to the French", or "contrary to his faith and allegiance". Soon after, on 20 December 1373, the escheator of the Duchy of Lancaster was ordered to confiscate all the lands Minsterworth held from John of Gaunt, Duke of Lancaster, Minsterworth's feudal lord in Gloucestershire and the Marches. Minsterworth appears to have been accompanied by his old comrade-in-arms, Thomas Fauconberg, who defected at the same time; "the fact that both these men took this huge step must be more than coincidence", argues . Describing it as an intriguing choice to make, he posits that Fauconberg was easily led, in this case by Minsterworth.

By 1376, King Charles had formulated a plan to invade England with a large Franco-Castilian Navy, or "army of the sea", as the French named it. Although the intended logistics of this campaign, or how it was to be implemented, is uncertain, Sumption has speculated that a French fleet was to "burn their way west" along the south coast of England on their way to land Owen of Wales at Milford Haven. Owen was a pretender to the throne of the Aberffraw princes, and Charles's plan was for him to lead a French expeditionary force army with the now-renegade Minsterworth. Sumption also argues that "what Minsterworth could contribute, or indeed expected to get out of this adventure, is more difficult to say".

Capture by the English 

Early in 1377 Minsterworth travelled to Castile to arrange the despatch of troops, materiel and transports for the  invasion. In March, he was captured in Pamplona, Navarre, by a Gascon squire; letters discussing the proposed invasion were found on him. Minsterworth was taken to Bordeaux before being returned to England. He originally landed at Bristol, but as a local landowner, appears to have had some support in the area. When the royal council discovered that an attempt at his rescue was planned, he was immediately transferred to the Tower of London. Under interrogation—including torture—Minsterworth revealed French plans to launch their galley fleet in May the following year.

He was tried for treason within the Guildhall in the City of London before the Mayor, Nicholas Brembre, and other royal justices. Here he also confessed to meeting Owen and stated that they were both to have led the invasion. This was deemed further treason, being "willful support of the King's enemies" and was sentenced to be drawn, hanged and quartered.

Execution 

Before his execution, Minsterworth was allowed write to the King. Although the letter is lost, it "probably contained an appeal for mercy and the usual kind of promise of information". He never received a response as it was probably opened by the Earl Marshal, Henry Percy, and never seen by Edward. This may have been, as suggested by David Moore, because Minsterworth named prominent sympathisers of Owen's which it was felt the King should be shielded from.

Minsterworth was executed on 12 April 1377 at Tyburn, and his body was quartered after death. One portion was sent to Carmarthen, the administrative centre of South Wales, probably to convey a "brutal message" to any would-be supporter of Owen. Another portion was sent to Bristol—where his estates were centred—and the remainder as far apart as Dover and Newcastle. Owen was assassinated by an English agent the following year. Minsterworth's head was placed above London Bridge, where it remained until the Peasant's revolt in 1381, when it was replaced on its pole by the head of Simon Sudbury, Archbishop of Canterbury.

Estates 
The  held after Minsterworth's execution casts light upon his land-holding, much of which was held directly off John of Gaunt, son of King Edward III. This was particularly concentrated in the southwest of England. His estate included  of land, five of meadow, and a messuage in Minsterworth itself. He held a corrody in Leonard Stanley, Gloucestershire for fee, as well as another messuage in the City of Gloucester. Minsterworth also held estates further afield; for example, in South Wales (around Usk), and Norfolk (in North Barsham).

Legacy
Minsterworth was distained by his contemporaries. Walsingham described him as "with a willing hand but a deceptive and distorted mind". In the mid-fifteenth century, the antiquarian John Leland dismissed him as "John Minsterworth English Traitor", and a century later Holinshed said Minsterworth was "a good man of his hands (as we call him) but perverse of mind, and verie deceitful". Sumption views the later events of Minsterworth's life as indicating that he was afflicted by mental instability. On the other hand, Sumption also suggests that—in view of how Minsterworth was trusted by Charles to make the arrangements with Castille and to lead the invasion fleet—"he must have been a plausible talker in spite of his shady past".

A 16th-century edition of Ranulf Higden's  1377 chronicle Polychronicon, contained an illustration of Minsterworth and a description of his execution.

Notes

References

Bibliography

 
 
 
 
 
 
 
 
 
 
 
 
 
 
 
 
 
 
 
 
 
 
 
 
 
 
 
 
 
 
 
 
 
 
 
 
 
 
 
 

1377 deaths
English knights
People of the Hundred Years' War
14th-century English people
People convicted of treason against England
People from Minsterworth